Hrach, also spelled Hratch or Herach, is an Armenian male or female given name meaning "eyes of flame." Origin is Hrachia or Hrachya.

People with the given name include:
Hrachia Adjarian (1876–1953), Armenian linguist
Hrach Bartikyan (1927–2011), Armenian academic
Hrach Gregorian (born 1949), American political consultant
Hrachya Harutyunyan (born 1961), Armenian actor
Hrach Hovhannisyan, Armenian Greco-Roman wrestler
Hrachya Keshishyan (born 1970), Armenian film director
Hrach Martirosyan (born 1964), Armenian linguist
Hrachya Melikyan (1947–2006), Armenian music composer and film composer
Hrachia Nersisyan (1895–1961), Armenian actor
Hrachya Petikyan (born 1960), Armenian sportshooter
Hrachya Qochar (1910–1965), Armenian writer, publicist, prizewinner of Armenian SSR
Haig "Hrach" Tiriakian (1871–1915), Armenian politician
Hrach Titizian (born 1979), American actor
Hratch Zadourian (born 1969), Lebanese cyclist
Hratch Chitilian (born 1981), Canadian 
Azniv Hrachya  (1853 or 1859 - 1920), Armenian actress

Others
Hrachya Ghaplanyan Drama Theatre, theatre based in Yerevan, the capital of Armenia
Hrach, fictional character in The Shield

Armenian masculine given names